Pat Adams is in the British Cycling Hall of Fame. He organised Mountain Mayhem and Sleepless in the Saddle.

References

Year of birth missing (living people)
Living people
British male cyclists